The Microregion of Jales is located on the northwest of São Paulo state, Brazil, and is made up of 23 municipalities. It belongs to the Mesoregion of São José do Rio Preto.

The microregion has a population of 149,197 inhabitants, in an area of 3,928.9 km²

Municipalities 
The microregion consists of the following municipalities, listed below with their 2010 Census populations (IBGE/2010):

Aparecida d'Oeste: 4,450
Aspásia: 1,809
Dirce Reis: 1,689
Dolcinópolis: 2,096
Jales: 47,012
Marinópolis: 2,113
Mesópolis: 1,886
Nova Canaã Paulista: 2,114
Palmeira d'Oeste: 9,584
Paranapuã: 3,815
Pontalinda: 4,074
Populina: 4,223
Rubinéia: 2,862
Santa Albertina: 5,723
Santa Clara d'Oeste: 2,084
Santa Fé do Sul: 29,239
Santa Rita d'Oeste: 2,543
Santa Salete: 1,447
Santana da Ponte Pensa: 1,641
São Francisco: 2,793
Três Fronteiras: 5,427
Urânia: 8,836
Vitória Brasil: 1,737

References

Jales